Fox Creek is a stream in southern Taney County, Missouri. It is a tributary of Bee Creek. The headwaters of the stream are just east of Missouri Route JJ west of Mincy. The stream flows southeast passing through a portion of the Drury-Mincy Conservation Area to its confluence with Bee Creek which flows into Bull Shoals Lake to the southeast near the Missouri-Arkansas border.

 
Fox Creek has the name of the local Fox family.

See also
List of rivers of Missouri

References

Rivers of Taney County, Missouri
Rivers of Missouri